Canada-Dominican Republic relations refers to the bilateral relations between the Canada and The Dominican Republic. Canada operates a Embassy in Santo Domingo and Dominican Republic operates a Embassy in Ottawa. The Dominican Republic also maintains two consulate generals in Montreal and Toronto.

History
Formal diplomatic relations were established between both nations in 1954. In 2017, the DR was the largest trading partner of Canada in the Caribbean. The DR maintains observer status in the Organisation internationale de la Francophonie, an organization that Canada is a full member of. Canada offered 177 students in the DR scholarships to Canadian Universities under The Emerging Leaders of the Americas program.

Trade
The DR exported US$490 Million worth of goods to Canada in 2019, with the largest export being gold. Canada exported US$163 Million worth of goods, with wheat being the largest export.

Immigration
Dominican Canadians are the fastest growing ethnic group from the Caribbean. As of 2016, there were 23,130 people in Canada with full or partial Dominican ancestry. Most Dominicans live in Quebec or Ontario. Montreal has the largest Dominican population in Canada with 6,690 residents of Dominican descent.

See also 

 Foreign relations of Canada
 Foreign relations of the Dominican Republic

Notes and references 

Canada–Dominican Republic relations
Dominican Republic
Bilateral relations of the Dominican Republic